Genital play is a common early childhood behavior of genital exploration distinct from autoerotic stimulation. This behavior is part of a normative period of children exploring all of their bodies, and some psychologists have even suggested genital play is a sign of healthy psychosexual development. 

Though genital play may rarely evolve directly into masturbation, the behavior is sometimes misinterpreted directly as masturbation by adults. 

Genital play usually begins in boys between six and seven months of age, and in girls at ten to eleven months. 
It may take place in groups, and sometimes utilizing inanimate objects such as dolls. Genital play may continue during early childhood. When the child is about six years old, a sexual latency period starts in which there can be some private masturbation. The latency phase ends when the child at ten years old enters preadolescence.

See also
Child sexuality
Playing doctor

References

Further reading

Sexuality and age
Childhood
Child sexuality